Kaempferia is a genus of plants in the ginger family. It is native to China, India, and Southeast Asia. 

The genus is named after the naturalist and traveller Engelbert Kaempfer, who lived in Japan and east Asia for the years 1689-1693 and was one of the first Europeans to write detailed descriptions of plants there.

Species 
Over 100 names have been proposed in the genus. The following are accepted:

 Kaempferia alboviolacea Ridl. - Vietnam
 Kaempferia angustifolia Roscoe - Bangladesh, Assam, Vietnam, Thailand, Sumatra
 Kaempferia attapeuensis Picheans. & Koonterm - Laos
 Kaempferia champasakensis Picheans. & Koonterm - Laos
 Kaempferia chayanii Koonterm - Laos
 Kaempferia cuneata Gagnep. - Vietnam
 Kaempferia elegans (Wall.) Baker in J.D.Hooker - Sichuan, Indochina, Borneo
 Kaempferia evansii Blatt. - southern India
 Kaempferia fallax Gagnep. - Laos, Thailand
 Kaempferia filifolia K.Larsen - Thailand
 Kaempferia fissa Gagnep. - Laos
 Kaempferia galanga L. - Yunnan, Assam, Bangladesh, India, Indochina
 Kaempferia gigantiphylla Picheans. & Koonterm - Laos
 Kaempferia gilbertii W.Bull - Myanmar
 Kaempferia glauca Ridl.  - Thailand
 Kaempferia grandifolia Saensouk & Jenjitt. - Thailand
 Kaempferia harmandiana Gagnep. - Laos, Cambodia
Kaempferia jenjittikuliae  - Thailand
Kaempferia koratensis Picheans. - Thailand
 Kaempferia laotica Gagnep. - Laos, Thailand
 Kaempferia larsenii Sirirugsa - Thailand
 Kaempferia lopburiensis Picheans. - Thailand
Kaempferia maculifolia Boonma & Saensouk -Thailand
 Kaempferia mahasarakhamensis Saensouk & P. Saensouk  - Thailand
Kaempferia nigrifolia Boonma & Saensouk - Thailand
 Kaempferia ovalifolia Roxb. - Myanmar
 Kaempferia parviflora Wall. ex Baker in J.D.Hooker - Bangladesh, Myanmar, Thailand, Cambodia
 Kaempferia philippinensis Merr. - Luzon
 Kampferia pseudoparviflora Saensouk and Saensouk - Thailand
 Kaempferia purpurea J.Koenig in A.J.Retzius - Phuket
 Kaempferia roscoeana Wall. - Myanmar, Thailand
 Kaempferia rotunda L. - China (Guangdong, Guangxi, Hainan, Taiwan, Yunnan), India, Nepal, Assam, Bangladesh, Indochina; naturalized in Java, Malaysia and Costa Rica
 Kaempferia saraburiensis Picheans. - Thailand 
 Kaempferia sawanensis Picheans. & Koonterm - Laos
 Kaempferia siamensis Sirirugsa - Thailand 
 Kaempferia simaoensis Y.Y.Qian - Yunnan
 Kaempferia sisaketensis Picheans. & Koonterm - Thailand 
 Kaempferia spoliata Sirirugsa - Thailand 
Kaempferia takensis Boonma & Saensouk - Thailand
 Kaempferia undulata Teijsm. & Binn. - Java

Research
Three species of Kaempferia, i.e., K. galanga, K. rotunda, and K. angustifolia, are well studied for their essential oils along with other important phytochemical and medicinal properties. The micropropagation procedures of K. galanga and K. rotunda have been studied by many groups for more than two decades, but  in vitro propagation of Kaempferia angustifolia was the first reported in 2018.

References

External links

 
Zingiberaceae genera